Drosophila bizonata is a species of fruit fly in the Drosophila bizonata species group in the Immigrans-tripunctata radiation of the Drosophila subgenus. Drosophila bizonata is found in Japan. D. bizonata breeds and feeds exclusively on mushrooms, and has a high tolerance for ibotenic acid, a toxic compound found in Amanita mushrooms.

References

External links

 Diptera.info

Insects described in 1938
bizonata